The Midwest Conference (MWC) is a college athletic conference affiliated with  the NCAA's Division III.  Member institutions are located in the Midwestern United States in the states of Illinois, Iowa, and Wisconsin. The Midwest Conference was created in 1994 with the merger of the Midwest Collegiate Athletic Conference, which had been sponsoring men's sports since 1921, and the Midwest Athletic Conference for Women, which was formed in 1977.

History

The organization of the Midwest Collegiate Athletic Conference (MCAC) was conceived at a meeting at Coe College on May 12, 1921. Charter members were Beloit College, Carleton College, Coe College, Cornell College, Knox College (Illinois) and Lawrence University. Hamline University and Millikin University joined the league in December 1921, but both of them later withdrew: Hamline after the 1929–30 academic year, and Millikin after the 1924–25 academic year.

Ripon College joined the conference in 1923, followed by Monmouth College in 1924, Grinnell College in 1940 and Lake Forest College in 1974. Illinois College and St. Norbert College joined in 1982 and Carroll University followed in 1992. Carleton withdrew following the 1982–83 academic year. St. Olaf College also competed in the conference from 1952 to 1974, as did the University of Chicago from 1976 to 1987. Coe and Cornell withdrew following the 1996–97 academic year with Cornell rejoining the league starting in the 2012–13 year. Macalester College joined as a football-only member starting in 2014.  The University of Chicago returned as a football-only member in 2017, and added baseball to its conference membership in the 2019 season (2018–19 school year).

The MWC split into North and South divisions for football, men's and women's tennis, baseball, and softball from 2012 through 2016. Divisional play ended with the departure of Carroll after the 2015–16 school year, and resumed for football only with the addition of the University of Chicago as an affiliate member for the 2017–18 season. St. Norbert left in 2021 for the Northern Athletics Collegiate Conference.

Chronological timeline
 1921 - The Midwest Conference (MWC) was founded as the Midwest Collegiate Athletic Conference (MCAC). Charter members included Beloit College, Carleton College, Coe College, Cornell College, Knox College and Lawrence College (now Lawrence University), effective beginning the 1921-22 academic year.
 1922 - Hamline University and Millikin College (now Millikin University) joined the MCAC, effective in the 1922-23 academic year.
 1923 - Ripon College joined the MCAC, effective in the 1923-24 academic year.
 1924 - Monmouth College joined the MCAC, effective in the 1924-25 academic year.
 1925 - Millikin left the MCAC, effective after the 1924-25 academic year.
 1930 - Hamline left the MCAC, effective after the 1929-30 academic year.
 1940 - Grinnell College joined the MCAC, effective in the 1940-41 academic year.
 1952 - St. Olaf College joined the MCAC, effective in the 1952-53 academic year.
 1974 - St. Olaf left the MCAC, effective after the 1973-74 academic year.
 1974 - Lake Forest College joined the MCAC, effective in the 1974-75 academic year.
 1976 - The University of Chicago joined the MCAC, effective in the 1976-77 academic year.
 1982 - Illinois College and St. Norbert College joined the MCAC, effective in the 1982-83 academic year.
 1983 - Carleton left the MCAC, effective after the 1982-83 academic year.
 1987 - U. of Chicago left the MCAC to join the University Athletic Association (UAA), effective after the 1986-87 academic year.
 1992 - Carroll College joined the MCAC, effective in the 1992-93 academic year.
 1994 - The MCAC has been rebranded when the conference merged with the women's-only Midwest Athletic Conference for Women (MACW; founded since the 1977-78 school year) to become the Midwest Conference (MWC), effective in the 1994-95 academic year.
 1997 - Coe and Cornell left the MWC, effective after the 1996-97 academic year.
 2012 - Cornell re-joined back to the MWC, effective in the 2012-13 academic year.
 2014 - Macalester College joined the MWC as an affiliate member for football, effective in the 2014 fall season (2014-15 academic year).
 2016 - Carroll left the MWC to join the College Conference of Illinois and Wisconsin (CCIW), effective after the 2015-16 academic year.
 2017 - The University of Chicago re-joined back to the MWC, but as an affiliate member for football, effective in the 2017 fall season (2017-18 academic year).
 2018 - The University of Chicago added baseball into its MWC affiliate membership, effective in the 2019 spring season (2018-19 academic year).
 2021 - St. Norbert left the MWC to join the Northern Athletics Collegiate Conference (NACC), effective after the 2020-21 academic year.
 2021 - Macalester left the MWC as an affiliate member for football, effective after the 2020 fall season (2020-21 academic year).

Member schools
Every member in the history of the MWC and its predecessor conferences, whether full, affiliate, current, or former, has been a private school.

Current members
The MWC currently has nine full members.

Notes

Affiliate members
The MWC currently has one affiliate member.

Notes

Former members
The MWC had eight former full members.

Notes

Former affiliate members
The MWC had one former affiliate member.

Membership timeline

Sports
, the MWC sponsors the following sports:

Conference facilities

See also

 Midwest Conference men's basketball tournament

References

External links